Acetanaerobacterium is a genus in the phylum Bacillota (Bacteria).

The genus contains a single species, A. elongatum ( Chen and Dong 2004, sp. nov.).

See also
 Bacterial taxonomy
 Microbiology

References 

Bacteria genera
Clostridiaceae
Monotypic bacteria genera